This is a timeline of the history of Moncton. This page includes major weather, progress, and infrastructure events in Greater Moncton.  You may also want to see List of entertainment events in Greater Moncton, or History of Moncton.

Aboriginal period
The original aboriginal inhabitants of the Petitcodiac River valley were the Mi'kmaq. Moncton is situated at the southern end of a traditional native portage route between the Petitcodiac River and Shediac Bay on the nearby Northumberland Strait.

17th century
1670s – Chignecto settlement at the head of the Bay of Fundy established by the Acadian people.
1686 – The earliest reference to the "Petcoucoyer River" on the de Meulles Map.
1700 – Chipodie Acadian settlement established at the mouth of the Petitcodiac River.

18th century
1733 – Community of "Le Coude" (The Elbow) established near Halls Creek, at site of present-day Moncton.
1751 – Fort Beauséjour at Aulac is built by France in response to the British construction of nearby Fort Lawrence.
1755 – British forces under the command of Lieutenant Colonel Robert Monckton take Fort Beausejour and rename it Fort Cumberland.
1755 – Expulsion of the Acadian people, including from the Petitcodiac River valley. Some Acadians escape into the woods and begin to conduct a resistance campaign against the British.
1758 – Battle of Stoney Creek, end of the Acadian resistance.
1761 – English Tantramar Township established.
1766 – Captain John Hall arrives from Pennsylvania with a land grant from the Philadelphia Land Company and establishes Monckton Township with eight immigrant "Deutsch" families. The community is named "The Bend of the Petitcodiac".
1780s – Acadians begin to return from exile and resettle in New Brunswick.

19th century
1810s – Wooden shipbuilding industry begins to become an important factor in the local economy.
1836 – Regular stage coach and mail service starts, connecting Halifax, Monckton Township and Saint John.
1855 – "The Bend" is incorporated as the town of "Moncton"; misspelling is due to a clerical error. The first mayor of the new town is the shipbuilder Joseph Salter.
1857 – The European and North American Railway opens its line between Moncton and Shediac.
1859 – E&NA RR opens second line between Moncton and Saint John.
1860s – Wooden shipbuilding industry collapses. Westmorland Bank falls into bankruptcy. Severe economic recession occurs in Moncton.
1862 – Moncton loses its incorporated status.
1868 – Times & Transcript founded.
1869 - Hurricane Saxby Gale caused extensive damage to the city including the Gunningsville Bridge.
1871 – Moncton selected to be the headquarters of the Intercolonial Railway of Canada.
1875 – Moncton able to reincorporate with the motto "Resurgo" (I rise again).
1890 – Moncton achieves city status.

20th century
1906 – Massive fire destroys ICR shops. City successfully lobbies federal government to have the shops rebuilt, preserving the local railway industry.
1912 – Moncton selected as the eastern terminus of the National Transcontinental Railway.
1913 – Moncton Public Library opened.
1918 – ICR and NTR merge, forming the Canadian National Railway. Moncton becomes headquarters of the CNR Maritime division.
1920 – Eaton's catalogue warehouse opens in Moncton.
1922 – "CNRA", Moncton's first radio station, goes on the air.
1926 – The Capitol Theatre opens.
1928 – Moncton Airport established, first commercial air traffic into and out of the city.
1929 – Moncton Flight College established.
1930 - Al G. Barnes Circus Train Wreck near Moncton.
1934 - CKCW-AM radio goes on the air.
1935 - Georgetown and Parkton Amalgamated with Moncton and became neighbourhoods.
1935 – Moncton High School founded.
1936 - The last hanging in New Brunswick.
1940 – CFB Moncton is established as the main military supply base in Atlantic Canada.
1954 – Moncton's first TV station, CKCW-TV goes on the air.
1959 – Dieppe Commandos founded.
1963 – Université de Moncton is founded.
1968 – The Petitcodiac River causeway is built.
1970s – Social unrest as Acadians become politically assertive over minority rights.
1973 - Lewisville and Tankville Amalgamated with Moncton.
1974 – Moncton Museum established.
1980s – Severe economic recession occurs due to several major employers terminating operations in the city, including the Eaton's catalogue division,  the CNR shops and CFB Moncton.
1981 – Codiac Transit (now Codiac Transpo) founded.
1984 – Pope John Paul II visits Moncton and stages papal mass for 75,000 celebrants.
1990s – "Moncton Miracle" occurs as the economy restructures with a shift towards information technology and call centres, as well as a refocussing upon the retail, distribution, transportation and light manufacturing sectors.
1990 – Crystal Palace Amusement Park opened.
1996 – The Wildcats of the QMJHL are established.
Atlantic Baptist University relocates to a new campus and achieves full university designation.
1997—Moncton disbands its municipal police force and acquires a contract with the RCMP. 
1999 – Moncton hosts the Francophonie Summit with the heads of state from 54 nations attending the conference.

21st century
2001 – North American airspace is closed following the World Trade Center attacks; ten international flights are diverted to Moncton.
2002 – Moncton becomes Canada's first officially bilingual city.
2002 – The Moncton Airport achieves International designation.
2005 – New Gunningsville Bridge opened.
2006 – Metro Moncton becomes the largest population centre in New Brunswick.
2008 – Moncton 2010 Stadium broke ground.
2014 – Three Royal Canadian Mounted Police officers were killed and two others injured in a shooting spree committed by 24-year-old resident Justin Bourque.
2014 – Crystal Palace amusement park closed to make way for Bass Pro Shops.
2018 – The Avenir Centre, moncton's newest downtown events centre, and new home of the Wildcats and the Magic (NBL Canada), opened its doors on September 8.

See also
 
History of Moncton
Petitcodiac Riverkeeper

Notes

History of New Brunswick by location
Timelines of cities in Canada
History of Moncton
New Brunswick-related lists